Owen Smith (born 7 November 1994) is a Welsh sprinter specialising in the 400 metres. He represented Great Britain at the 2019 and 2021 European Indoor Championships winning bronze in the 4 × 400 metres relay on the second occasion.

International competitions

(The slowest man in Sytner Cardiff)

Personal bests
Outdoor
200 metres – 21.54 (Yate 2021)
400 metres – 46.23 (Oordegem 2016)
Indoor
200 metres – 22.09 (Vienna 2019)
400 metres – 46.37 (Birmingham 2019)

References

1994 births
Living people
Welsh male sprinters
British male sprinters
Sportspeople from Mold, Flintshire